Ronald Young (August 19, 1947 – May 19, 2019) was an American politician.

Young graduated from the Langley-Bath-Clearwater High School. He served on the Aiken County School Board. He was a member of the South Carolina House of Representatives, who represented the 84th district as a Republican. He was elected to the House via a special election after the resignation of Chris Corley. Previously, Young served as chairman of the Aiken County Council since 1994, and as a member for 26 years.

Young, who had been in hospice care due to pancreatic cancer, liver cancer and a stroke suffered weeks prior, died on May 19, 2019 at the age of 71.

References

1947 births
2019 deaths
People from Aiken County, South Carolina
County council members in South Carolina
School board members in South Carolina
Republican Party members of the South Carolina House of Representatives
21st-century American politicians
Deaths from cancer in South Carolina
Deaths from pancreatic cancer
20th-century American politicians